CNFC may refer to:

Chamois Niortais F.C.
Conseil national des femmes du Canada